Homero Blancas, Jr. (born March 7, 1938) is an American professional golfer who has played on both the PGA Tour and the Senior PGA Tour (now known as the Champions Tour).

Amateur career
Blancas, who is of Mexican American descent, was born in Houston, Texas. He attended the University of Houston from 1958 to 1962, and was a member of the golf team. Blancas shot a record-setting round of 55 (27-28) in a college tournament, which stands as the lowest round in the history of competitive golf. His 13 birdies and an eagle on a par-70 course in Longview, Texas on August 19, 1962 earned him the nickname "Mr. 55." He was inducted into the University of Houston Athletics Hall of Fame in 1978.

Blancas' 55 shot round (played on a course of just over 5,000 yards) was included in the Guinness Book of Records for a time, but shortly after officials removed his name after instituting a requirement that a course must be of at least 6,500 yards to achieve inclusion. The 55 shot round is still the lowest official golf score on record for course of regular par.

Professional career
Blancas won four PGA Tour events. He turned pro in 1965 and was the PGA Rookie of the Year that year. He was a member of the 1973 Ryder Cup team. During his career on the PGA Tour, he had more than 4 dozen top-10 finishes. His best finishes in a major championship were a T-4 at the 1972 U.S. Open, and a T-5 at the 1972 Masters. Blancas spent the last 16 years of his regular career as club pro at Randolph Park in Tucson.

After turning 50 in March 1988, Blancas joined the Senior Tour. He has one victory in this venue – at the 1989 Doug Sanders Kingwood Celebrity Classic. He has 18 holes-in-one during his career, is a member of the Texas Golf Hall of Fame, and lives in Houston.

Amateur wins
1962 W.E. Cole Cotton States Invitational
1963 W.E. Cole Cotton States Invitational
1964 W.E. Cole Cotton States Invitational

Professional wins (8)

PGA Tour wins (4)

PGA Tour playoff record (1–1)

Other wins (3)
1960 Texas State Open (as an amateur)
1963 Louisiana State Open (as an amateur)
1965 Mexican Open

Senior PGA Tour wins (1)

Results in major championships

Note: Blancas never played in The Open Championship.

CUT = missed the half-way cut
"T" indicates a tie for a place

Sources:

U.S. national team appearances
Professional
Ryder Cup: 1973 (winners)

References

External links

American male golfers
Houston Cougars men's golfers
PGA Tour golfers
PGA Tour Champions golfers
Ryder Cup competitors for the United States
Golfers from Houston
American sportspeople of Mexican descent
1938 births
Living people